The Haveli of Nau Nihal Singh (Urdu/), officially known as Government Victoria Girls' High School, is a haveli that houses a government school located in Lahore, Pakistan. Dating from the Sikh era of the mid-19th century, the haveli is considered to be one of the finest examples of Sikh architecture in Lahore, and is the only Sikh-era haveli that preserves its original ornamentation and architecture.

Location
The haveli is located within the Walled City of Lahore, and is located near the Mori Gate in the southern half of the walled city. The haveli is also near the Bhatti Gate and Lohari Gate.

History
The haveli was built around the late 1830s for Kanwar Nau Nihal Singh, by his grandfather and founder of the Sikh Empire, Maharaja Ranjit Singh. The mansion was intended to be a personal residence for Nau Nihal Singh. His grandmother, Maharani Datar Kaur, too played a considerable role in habilitation of the haveli. 

In 1841 Nau Nihal Singh's widow, Bibi Sahib Kaur Sahiba, delivered a stillborn son minutes before her own death. This prompted his mother, Maharani Chand Kaur to give up her claim on the golden throne of Punjab. The dowager Maharani retired to this haveli and received a pension of  rupees. However her enemies still saw her as a threat and she was battered to death with wooden pikes by her servants on 11 June 1842.

The haveli has been used, since the British colonial era, to house the Victoria Girls' High School.

Architecture
The base of the haveli is rectangular in shape, with its entrance on the western side. The façade is divided into two sections, with the portion housing the haveli's entryway profusely decorated with frescoes painted in the vivid Kangra style, and the other pierced with numerous windows. 

A large jharoka balcony with sculpted brickwork and a small bulbous half dome is above the haveli's entry, which acted as a Jharoka-e-Darshan from which the Maharaja could view his subjects gathered below. The jharoka features 5 small arches, and is embellished imagery of winged humans, parrots, and frontally-viewed fish that are carved in a style which displays East Asian influences. The winged humans resemble both Islamic descriptions of angels, but also reflect influences of the mythical Hindu garuda. The base of the dome is decorated with a serpent-like figure which echoes the Hindu snake god Naga. The Jharoka-e-Darshan is flanked by two smaller jharokas. Each of the haveli's jharokas is decorated with a floral pedestal.

The building has four stories, and a basement level. The fourth level is made of a small room known as Rang Mahal ("Colour palace"), or alternatively as Sheesh Mahal ("Mirror palace"), with large screens that form a space in which to catch breezes. The remaining floors were built with high ceilings, to exaggerate the height of the structure in order to give the appearance of a citadel, rather than a private residence.

The ceilings of the haveli are made of decorated wood inlaid with glass and mirror, as well as sun-motifs in the central portion of the roof. Walls within the haveli are decorated with false arches that each contain a small 18 inch by 18 inch painting, with blues, golds, reds, and oranges dominating the haveli's colour palette. The interior is also decorated with carved wood, brickwork, and floral frescoes.

The haveli features a large 2 storied inner courtyard which was also profusely decorated - the bottom level of which has since been whitewashed. In front of the haveli is a small plaza known as Maydan ka Bhaiyan that was once used as the haveli's garden.

Conservation
The haveli is protected by the Antiquities Act 1975.

Gallery

See also
 House of Dilip Kumar, Peshawar
 Kapoor Haveli

References

Walled City of Lahore
Architecture in Pakistan
 
Buildings and structures in Lahore
Houses in Pakistan
Schools in Lahore